City Hospital (formerly Dudley Road Hospital, and still commonly referred to as such) is a major hospital located in Birmingham, England, operated by the Sandwell and West Birmingham Hospitals NHS Trust. It provides an extensive range of general and specialist hospital services. It is located in the Winson Green area of the west of the city.

It is slated to be replaced by the delayed Midland Metropolitan University Hospital, with the Treatment Centre and separate eye hospital, the Birmingham and Midland Eye Centre, remaining on the Dudley Road campus, the rest of which will be redeveloped for housing.

History
The hospital was first built in 1889 as an extension to the Birmingham Union Workhouse (whose entrance building, though derelict, survived until September 2017). It originally comprised a single corridor stretching for a quarter of a mile with nine Nightingale ward blocks radiating from it along its length. The original design was by an architect called W. H. Ward and was designed around a configuration recommended by Florence Nightingale.

It was originally known as the Birmingham Union Infirmary, later Dudley Road Infirmary, before becoming Dudley Road Hospital. One of its notable surgeons, Hamilton Bailey, took the photos for the first edition of his famous textbook while at Dudley Road.

The Birmingham Treatment Centre opened on the City Hospital site in November 2005. This diagnosis and treatment centre replaces the existing Outpatient Department.

See also
 List of hospitals in England

References

Hospital buildings completed in 1885
Hospital buildings completed in 2005
Hospitals in Birmingham, West Midlands
NHS hospitals in England
Poor law infirmaries